Sharrod Victor Ford (born September 9, 1982) is an American former professional basketball player. He played briefly in the National Basketball Association (NBA), as well as in a variety of top leagues around the world.

Early years
Ford attended Clemson University from 2001 to 2005. At Clemson, he became the school's first player to lead his team in points and rebounds for two consecutive seasons since Horace Grant in the 1980s.

Professional career
Ford went undrafted at the 2005 NBA draft. On November 2, 2005, he signed with the Phoenix Suns. He was waived by the Suns on December 24, 2005, after appearing in three NBA league games.

On January 10, 2006, he was acquired by the Fayetteville Patriots of the NBA D-League. He appeared in 15 games for the Patriots. In February 2006, he moved to Germany and signed with Alba Berlin for the rest of the season. With Alba he won the 2006 German Cup. On July 31, 2006, he re-signed with Alba for one more season.

For the 2007–08 season, he signed with the Italian club Sutor Montegranaro. For the 2008–09 season, he moved to Virtus Bologna, also of Italy. With Bologna, he won the 2008–09 FIBA EuroChallenge.

On September 18, 2009, he signed with Spartak Saint Petersburg. On November 16, 2009, he parted ways with Spartak. On January 10, 2010, he returned to Italy, and signed with Basket Club Ferrara, for the rest of the season. On July 19, 2010, he returned to his former team. Sutor Montegranaro. for the 2010–11 season.

On July 21, 2011, he signed with Bayern Munich. However, he left the team during the pre-season. In February 2012, he joined the Erie BayHawks of the NBA D-League, but left after only 6 games.

On August 20, 2012, he signed with the German club Brose Baskets. With Brose Baskets, he won the 2012–13 Bundesliga, and the 2013 BBL Champions Cup. On July 29, 2013, he re-signed with Brose for one more season.

On June 30, 2014, he signed a one-year deal with Paris-Levallois. On April 16, 2015, he was named to the All-EuroCup Second Team, after averaging 15.1 points and 8.8 rebounds per game.

On July 24, 2015, he signed with Acıbadem Üniversitesi of the Turkish Basketball Second League. On August 3, 2016, he re-signed with Acıbadem Üniversitesi for one more season.

References

External links
 RealGM.com profile
 FIBA.com profile

1982 births
Living people
African-American basketball players
Alba Berlin players
American expatriate basketball people in France
American expatriate basketball people in Germany
American expatriate basketball people in Italy
American expatriate basketball people in Russia
American expatriate basketball people in Turkey
American men's basketball players
Basketball players from Washington, D.C.
BC Spartak Saint Petersburg players
Brose Bamberg players
Centers (basketball)
Clemson Tigers men's basketball players
Erie BayHawks (2008–2017) players
Fayetteville Patriots players
Lega Basket Serie A players
Metropolitans 92 players
Phoenix Suns players
Power forwards (basketball)
Sutor Basket Montegranaro players
Undrafted National Basketball Association players
Virtus Bologna players
Hargrave Military Academy alumni
21st-century African-American sportspeople
20th-century African-American people